Shchurove is a village in Kramatorsk Raion (district) in Donetsk Oblast of eastern Ukraine, at about  north by west from the centre of Donetsk city, on the left bank of the Siverskyi Donets river. It belongs to Lyman urban hromada, one of the hromadas of Ukraine.

References

External links

Villages in Kramatorsk Raion